Scott Starks (born July 23, 1983) is a former American football cornerback for the Jacksonville Jaguars of the National Football League (NFL). Jason Fletcher of B&F Sports was his agent. He is known for recovering a Kyle Orton fumble and running it back for a touchdown to help the Wisconsin Badgers defeat the Purdue Boilermakers in the 2004 season. Starks was also a track star at the Wisconsin, where he competed in the 100 meters, posting a personal best of 10.64 seconds.

1983 births
American football cornerbacks
Wisconsin Badgers football players
Jacksonville Jaguars players
Living people